Pavel Mačák (born 7 February 1957) is a Czech former footballer who is last known to have played as a goalkeeper for FC Remscheid.

Career

In 1983, Mačák signed for German second division side Schalke, where he made 17 league appearances and scored 0 goals, helping them earn promotion to the German Bundesliga. On 11 February 1984, he debuted for Schalke during a 3-0 win over Rot-Weiß Oberhausen. In 1987, he signed for ASC Schöppingen in the German third division.  In 1989, Mačák signed for German fourth division club FC 96, helping them earn promotion to the German third division.

References

External links
 

Czech footballers
Living people
FC Schalke 04 players
1957 births
Association football goalkeepers
Expatriate footballers in Germany
Bundesliga players
Czech expatriate sportspeople in Germany
FC Remscheid players
FC Baník Ostrava players
ASC Schöppingen players
2. Bundesliga players
Czech expatriate footballers
Czechoslovak emigrants to Germany